Xenia Stad-de Jong (4 March 1922 – 3 April 2012) was a Dutch track and field athlete who competed in sprinting events.

Born in Semarang in the former Dutch East Indies (Indonesia), her greatest success was winning the gold medal as the first runner in the 4 x 100 metres relay at the 1948 Summer Olympics, together with Netty Witziers-Timmer, Gerda van der Kade-Koudijs and Fanny Blankers-Koen. She took part in the individual 100 metres event, where she was eliminated in the semi-finals.

In 1950, she won another medal with the Dutch relay team when they finished second at the 1950 European Championships. She ran in the individual 100 m at the championships as well.

Stad-de Jong died in the Dutch city of Zoetermeer in 2012, aged 90.

References

1922 births
2012 deaths
Dutch female sprinters
Athletes (track and field) at the 1948 Summer Olympics
European Athletics Championships medalists
Medalists at the 1948 Summer Olympics
Olympic athletes of the Netherlands
Olympic gold medalists for the Netherlands
People from Semarang
Olympic gold medalists in athletics (track and field)
Olympic female sprinters
Dutch people of the Dutch East Indies
20th-century Dutch women